The Coca-Cola Young Professionals' Championship was a golf tournament on the British PGA tournament circuit that was played from 1968 to 1976. Entry was restricted to players under 25 years old. Coca-Cola sponsorship ended in 1974. The 1975 event was called the T.P.D. Young Professionals' Championship while the final event in 1976 was called the T.P.D. Under-25 Championship.

Winners

In 1969, Barnes beat Gallacher at the first extra hole with a birdie 3.

References

Golf tournaments in England
Recurring sporting events established in 1968
Recurring events disestablished in 1976
Coca-Cola